Bokson is a rural locality (a settlement) in Okinsky District, Republic of Buryatia, Russia. The population was 122 as of 2010. There are 10 streets.

Geography 
Bokson is located 66 km southeast of Orlik (the district's administrative centre) by road. Sorok is the nearest rural locality.

References 

Rural localities in Okinsky District